Bill Crowley may refer to:

 Bill Crowley (baseball) (1857–1891), American Major League Baseball player
 Bill Crowley (sportscaster) (1920–1996), American sportscaster